La Chapelle-Saint-Étienne is a former commune in the Deux-Sèvres department in the Nouvelle-Aquitaine region in western France. On 1 January 2019, it was merged into the new commune Moncoutant-sur-Sèvre.

See also
Communes of the Deux-Sèvres department

References

Former communes of Deux-Sèvres